Gona is a paleoanthropological research area in the Afar Triangle of Ethiopia located in the Ethiopian Lowlands. The study area, near the Middle Awash and Hadar paleoanthropological study areas, is primarily known for it's archaeological sites and discoveries of Late Miocene and Early Pliocene fossils  as well as Oldowan and Acheulean stone tools. Evidence of Homo erectus presence at Gona dates back to as early as 1.8 million years ago, making Gona's stone tools some of the world's oldest stone tool artifacts found to date. Gona is also known as a key site for the study of human evolution, with a rich hominin fossil record that includes evidence of Ardipithecus remains dating to around 4.5 million years old and Homo erectus fossils from approximately 1.8 to 1.7 million years ago. Likewise, faunal remains such as cutmarked bones from Gona give insight into early hominin diets and butchery practices, making it an important site for zooarchaeology.

Geography

The Ethiopian Highlands are divided in two by the Rift Valley. To the northeast of the rift are the regions of Afar and Middle Awash; to the southwest is the Omo region. Gona and its archaeological sites are located in the Afar Triangle of Ethiopia, between the Awash River to the east and the Western Ethiopian escarpment that rises to the west. To the north of Gona is the Mille-Bati road, and the As Bole drainage system lies to the south. Geologically, the area is known for basalt and trachyte rock, which is regionally used to make stone tools. Many of the area's archaeological sites are located near stream channels and riverbanks.

Paleoanthropology 
Hominid fossils from Gona are used by palaeoanthropologists studying human evolution in the Late Miocene, Pliocene, and Early Pleistocene. Few hominid fossils from this period have been found, and most are from a small number of sites in Chad, Ethiopia, Kenya, Tanzania, and South Africa. The uplifted western part of the Gona study area is one of these key sites. Here, multiple cranial fragments such as jaws and teeth and several postcranial finds have been identified as Ardipithecus ramidus. These fragmentary remains were dated to 4.51-4.32 million years ago using argon-argon dating.  The teeth were used to discern the species based on the distinctive wear pattern and the morphology of both the upper canine and lower P3 (third premolar). A partial fragmentary skeleton (GWM67/P2) and additional fragmentary finds of postcrania uncovered in Gona have contributed to the understanding of Ar. ramidus’s locomotion. They also give us unique insight into hominin hand evolution, based on the shape of the scaphoid bone.

Geology 
The geological record of Gona covers an unusually long period: one of the longest in East Africa. There are four major geological formations which span the last six million years: (1) the Adu-Asa, from 6.4–5.2 Ma; (2) the Sagantole, from 4.6–3.9 Ma; (3) the Hadar, from 3.8–2.9 Ma; and (4) the Busidima Formations, from 2.7-0.16 Ma. The onset of deposition at Gona began as a result of rifting and volcanism in the Afar Basin in the Early Miocene, which continues today. The Sagantole Formation in the uplifted western part of the Gona study area is “cut by largely west-dipping normal faults and is bounded on the east side by a major structural feature” (Quade et al., 2004). This feature is the As Duma Fault, which created a half-graben for the Hadar and Busidima Formations to fill in. The Busidima Formation has a slight tilt of 1-2 degrees to the southwest. The Awash River and tributaries have deeply dissected Gona's modern landscape and are the main reason for the exposure of its rich array of fossils and archaeological sites.

Zooarchaeology 
The bones, shells, and hides that animals leave behind after death are known as faunal remains, which are studied in the sub-discipline of zooarchaeology. Faunal remains provide archaeological insight into the behavior and foodways of early hominids. Not only do they reveal the types of food consumed, they may also evidence the methods of food preparation - such as butchery. Excavations in the Lower Busidima Formation at Gona show that faunal food resources at the site included equids and bovids. Cutmarked animal bones show signs of butchery practices including skinning and filleting.

Cutmarked bone 
Archaeological sites that preserve both faunal remains and stone tool assemblages are known as Type C sites and are important to studying connections between topics like meat consumption and stone tool manufacture. The DAN2 (Dana Aoule) site at Gona is an example of a Type C assemblage including five cutmarked bones dated to approximately 2.1 Ma (millions of years ago). Cutmarked specimens are important because they can provide evidence of early hominid hunting and butchering techniques.

The cutmarked bones from DAN2 included a tibia midshaft fragment and four skeletal fragments that could not be definitively classified. These fragments showed signs of filleting that are most commonly left on upper limb bones during experimental butchery studies. While more data is needed to make wider inferences about the acquisition of meat during the Pliocene period, studies at Gona and contemporary sites like the Bouri Formation suggest that early stone tools were primarily used for butchery. The existence of cutmarked bones at Gona suggests that hominids were acquiring at least some "fleshed carcasses" - possibly through hunting, rather than scavenging.

Stone tools 
Stone tools from Gona were first excavated from sedimentary deposits in the Hadar region of the Awash valley in 1976. Many of the stone tools found at this site were made from local basalt and trachyte rock; a smaller number were made from imported stones like chert. A majority of the tools found at Gona are from the Oldowan Industry, also known as Mode 1, and date to around 2.6-1.6 mya. There is also evidence of the co-occurrence of Oldowan and Acheulean, or Mode 2, stone tools at Gona: artifacts from both stone tool industries were discovered close to a Homo erectus cranial fossil. These findings suggest an overlap of stone tool technology, challenging the idea that a single technology was used by a single species (like early Homo). The Oldowan artifacts at Gona also represent the oldest stone tool assemblages in the world - around 2.6 million years old - and provide insight into the practices of early stone tool manufacture. Radiometric dating and magnetic polarity methods were used to determine the ages of these stone tool artifacts.

The Acheulean presence at Gona ranges between 1.6 and 1.2 Ma, or maybe even younger. Several sites containing Acheulean artifacts include the BSN12, DAN5, and OGS12 sites. Bifacially flaked hand axes, cleavers, picks, and unmodified debitage have been found at the surface of the BSN12 site in Gona: all indicative of the Acheulean tradition. Handaxes recovered from the DAN5 and BSN12 sites were reduced from cobbles sourced from nearby river conglomerates. Bipolar reduction strategies were practiced by Homo erectus at Gona to make the most out of the local lithics, using both Mode 1 and Mode 2 technologies. Differences in raw material sources probably account for the smaller tool sizes at Gona compared to other Acheulean sites such as Konso.

Mary Leakey's stone tool typology organizes early stone assemblages into six categories: "Flaked Pieces (cores/choppers), Detached Pieces (flakes and fragments), Pounded Pieces (cobbles utilized as hammerstones), and Unmodified Pieces (manuports, stones transported to sites)." The artifacts at Gona include whole flakes, simple cores, and flaking debris like uniface and a few biface cores that are rarer at the site. Practices of modified shaping by pounding and battering are preserved in artifacts like hammerstones and anvils at Gona. Unlike excavations at Olduvai, there is no current evidence of retouched flakes like stone scrapers at Gona. However, the sharp edges on the tools found at the site suggest mastery of basic stone tool manufacture. The pitting and other wear marks suggest that the tools were used for many everyday activities like cutting meat or pounding bones to extract marrow. 

Other important sites for stone tool assemblages in Ethiopia include Omo, Hadar, and Bouri as well as Lokalalei in Kenya.

See also
 List of fossil sites (with link directory)
 List of hominina (hominid) fossils (with images)

References 

Archaeological sites in Ethiopia
Prehistoric Africa
Kada Gona
Paleoanthropological sites
Archaeological sites of Eastern Africa